The 1992 British League season was the 58th season of the top tier of speedway in the United Kingdom and the 28th known as the British League.

Summary
Reading Racers won the league for the second time in three years. Four riders who won the 1990 title (Jeremy Doncaster, Per Jonsson, Jan Andersson and Dave Mullett) were integral during the 1992 campaign. They were joined by Italian Armando Castagna and Ray Morton. Bradford Dukes retained their Knockout Cup title. 

World Champion Jan O. Pedersen topped the averages for Cradley Heath.

Final table
M = Matches; W = Wins; D = Draws; L = Losses; Pts = Total Points

British League Knockout Cup
The 1992 British League Knockout Cup was the 54th edition of the Knockout Cup for tier one teams. Bradford Dukes were the winners for the second successive year.

First round

Quarter-finals

Semi-finals

Final

First leg

Second leg

Bradford Dukes were declared Knockout Cup Champions, winning on aggregate 92-88.

Final leading averages

Riders & final averages
Arena Essex

 8.89
 8.18
 7.08
 6.94
 6.10
 5.50
 4.97
 3.11
 3.02
 0.44

Belle Vue

 9.05
 8.92
 8.83
 6.84
 6.12
 5.95
 3.73

Bradford

 9.50
 8.75 
 8.25 
 7.55
 6.70
 6.16
 2.44
 2.11
 1.79
 1.38

Coventry

 8.91
 8.14
 7.64
 7.08
 6.24
 5.49
 4.79
 3.87

Cradley Heath

 11.37 (only 4 matches)
 9.41
 8.64
 7.91 
 7.40 
 6.33
 4.17
 3.79

Eastbourne

 8.63
 7.18
 6.58
 5.84
 5.81
 5.71
 5.57
 4.75

Ipswich

 8.33
 7.46
 7.10 
 6.93
 6.76
 6.65
 4.86

King's Lynn

 8.86 
 8.85 
 7.54
 6.50
 6.35
 5.28
 5.24
 2.34
 1.67

Oxford

 10.24 
 8.94 
 6.09
 5.22
 5.21
 5.11
 2.43
 2.35

Poole

 9.26
 8.56
 7.97
 6.40
 6.33
 5.63
 5.53
 4.43

Reading

 10.04 
 8.36
 7.88
 7.65
 7.09
 6.77
 2.89

Swindon

 9.49
 7.37
 7.16
 6.09
 5.75
 3.67
 2.88
 2.73

Wolverhampton

 10.25
 9.36
 7.79
 6.83
 5.17
 4.17
 4.00
 2.40

See also
List of United Kingdom Speedway League Champions
Knockout Cup (speedway)

References

British League
1992 in British motorsport
1992 in speedway